Narrien Range is a national park in Queensland, Australia, 796 km northwest of Brisbane.

See also
 Protected areas of Queensland

References 

National parks of Queensland
Central West Queensland